Imbe gumi (also spelled Imibe gumi or Inbe gumi) was a Japanese clan during the Yamato period. They claimed descent from Futodama.

The Inbe clan originally had a religious function by preparing and taking care of offerings.

Overview 

As the name of the family "Imu" means "to abstain from Kegare", or "Saibai", the Imu clan was responsible for the rituals of the ancient Imperial Court, as well as for making ritual implements and building palaces. In the narrow sense, it refers to the Imaibe family, the central family that led the Imaibe family, but in the broad sense, it includes the clans of the tribesmen who were led by the Imaibe family.

The main Imaibe family claimed its ancestor was Amatatama-no-mikoto, who appeared in the Amano-Iwato myth of the Chronicles. It was based in the area around the present-day town of Imbe in Kashihara, Nara.  They led the various families in the region, and together with the Nakatomi clan, administered rituals for the Imperial Court since ancient times. In the Shukushi of the Enki-Shiki, it is written, "Let the Saibe families's shukushi be used for the rituals of the palace and the gates, and let the Nakatomi clan's shukushi be used for all other rituals."

However, starting around the Nara period, the Nakatomi family grew in power, and overwhelmed the Inbe position. In the early Heian period, the clan changed its name from Imaibe to Saibe, and Saibe Hironari wrote the book Kogo Shūi. However, it never regained its momentum, and the position of ritual clan was occupied by the Nakatomi and Ohnakatomi familiess.

The Imbe were divided into two groups: the Tomobe (public officials belonging to the imperial court) and the Kakibe (private citizens of the Imbe). Unlike the Saibes of the central families, who had fewer and fewer achievements, the Imbe of the various regions included Izumo, who delivered jade, Kii, who delivered wood, Awa, who delivered cotton and linen, and Sanuki, who delivered shields. It is known from the literature that the people of these tribes later took the name of Imaibe. These local clans left their traces everywhere.

Origins 

In the Kojiki and the Nihon Shoki, it is written that Amenotama-no-mikoto and Amenokoya-no-mikoto were involved in rituals in the myth of Amano-Iwato. Ame-no-Koyane were involved in the ritual relationship, and both deities were followed together in the Descent of the Sun. Both of these deities were in charge of the rituals of the Imperial Court at the time of the compilation of the Chronicles. This reflects the difference in power between the Nakatomi gumi and the Imbe gumi at the time of the compilation. On the contrary, the position is reversed in the Kogo Shūi of the Imbe family.

The Kogo Shūi on the side of the Imbe clan reverses its position. As for the origin of Amata-tamamikoto, the Kogo Shūi says that he is the son of Takamimusubi no Kami, and the Shinsen Surname Records follows this, but the origin is not mentioned in the Kojiki or Nihonshoki, so the truth is not clear.

History 
The clan started off as low class but gained power due to religious reasons.  During the reign of Emperor Kōtoku, the Inbe, along with the Nakatomi and Urabe families, were tasked with supervising Jingikan.  The clan lost its power during the reign of Emperor Shōmu. In the year 927 CE, members of the clan lost their long-standing right to present asa cloth for use in the imperial rituals.

The Imbe clan is said to have established itself around the late 5th century to early 6th century, and initially took the name "Imbe 首 (Obito)". Yamato Province Takaichi-gun Kanahashi-mura Imbe (now Nara Prefecture Kashihara City, Imbe Town) as the Honkan (base). , where the Amata-tamamikoto Shrine (Shikinai Meishin-taisha), dedicated to the ancestral deity Amata-tamamikoto, still remains. He was also involved in the construction of temples and palaces, as well as in the manufacture of ritual implements.

He was also involved in making ritual implements and building temples and palaces. His name is first mentioned in the Nihon Shoki, Daika first year (645) article, where he was sent to Mino Province by Imbe Shukomaro to levy divine money. During the Jinshin War of the first year of Tenmu (672), the Imbe Shukoto (also known as Shukoto or Shukoto) belonged to the shogun Otomo Fukiage and defended the ancient capital of Yamato with Aratao Nao Akamaro. In the 9th year of Emperor Temmu's reign (680), he and his younger brother Irofuru (色夫知/色布知) were given the Kabane of Ren (Muraji). In addition, in the 13th year of Emperor Temmu's reign (684), he received the Kabane of Shukune (Sukune) along with 50 other clans of the Ren surname. In the fourth year of Emperor Jitō (690), when Emperor Jitō ascended to the throne, Irofuro offered a sword and mirror with the divine seal, and in the first year of Keiun (704), his son was appointed as a minister to Ise. In the first year of the Keiun reign (704), a son was appointed to the post of Ise minister.

In the first year of the Keiun reign (704), his son was appointed as Ise bounty messenger. In Tenpyo 7 (735), the Imbe Shukune Mushi-na, Torimaro, and others appealed for the appointment of the Imbe clan as bishops, and their appeal was granted. However, in June of Tenpyō-shōhō 9 (757), only the Nakatomi clan was appointed, and no other surnames were recognized. After this, the Nakatomi (and later the Ohnakatomi) clan's exclusion of other clans became so pronounced that some of them were not even allowed to hold positions unique to the Imbe family.

In Enryaku 22 (803), the name was changed to Saibu upon the application of Imbe Sukune Hamanari. In the first year of Daidō (806), the dispute with the Nakatomi clan developed into a situation of complaint between the two family, and in the same year, an imperial order decreed that prayers should be offered by both clans, and that both clans should be used equally for consecration messengers other than for regular worship. Then, in Daido 2 (807), Kogo Shūi was written by Saibe Hironari, criticizing the tradition of the Saibe clan and the Nakatomi family.

However, the Saibe family has been pushed back by the power of the Nakatomi gumi and is no longer visible on the stage of history. In the Shinsen Seijiroku of 815, the name "Saibe Shukune" is listed as a descendant of Amatatama-no-mikoto, son of Taka-no-Sanrei-no-mikoto, in the ShImbetsu (heavenly deity) section.

The story of Aba Imbe's relocation to the east 
In the "Kokugo Shiki" and other works, the following story is known as the origin of the name "Boso" by Aba Imbe, a tribesman.

Records 

"Gleanings of Ancient Words" (established in 807) According to a story in the Sekaiyo Kyu-jihonki and Sekaiyo Kyu-jihonki, Amatomi-no-mikoto (grandson of Amatatatama-no-mikoto), a distant ancestor of the Imbe clan, led the Saibe-no-mikoto of various regions to make various ritual implements, and led the Saibe-no-mikoto of Awa to the east in search of a better land, where he planted hemp (asa) and grain (Paper mulberry) in the area.

The book goes on to say that the hemp planted by Amatomi-no-mikoto grew so well that the land became known as the "So Province", and the land where the grain trees grew became known as the "Yuki District". The area where Abasaibu settled was named "Abo District" . In addition, he built the Taitamonomiyosha in the same place, which is the Awa Shrine (comparable to the present Awa Shrine in Chiba Prefecture, Tateyama, Chiba). It is also said that the Saibu clan is located in Kobe (a minto attached to the shrine). .

Proof 
In the sermons, "fusa" is used as an archaic word for hemp, but research to date has shown that the character "fusa" does not have the meaning of hemp. 33-35}} It is also said that the name "Fuji" was derived from the word "so", which means "a bundle of hemp". In contrast to these theories, a wooden letter excavated from the Fujiwara-kyo shows "Kami-daiji-kuni Aba-hyo Matsu-ri in the tenth month of the year of self-diagnosis" with the word "fusa" in place of "so". In the "History of Chiba Prefecture", the word "Kami-dijioku" was once deciphered as "Kami-dijioku", but in the "History of Chiba Prefecture" it has been redeciphered as "Kami-dijioku" and although the story in "Kokugo Shuke" cannot be easily believed, the meaning of "daihō", "fruitful in bunches", can be applied to hemp seeds, and thus it is not surprising that in the fourth year of Daihō (704), the national seal was distributed. It is possible that the Boshoku area was actually called "Goji" (i.e. "Goji" in Japanese) before the unification of the word "Goji" with the distribution of the national seal in 704. The "up and down" division of the Boso region is older than the "back and forth" division, with the "Imperial Annals" placing the establishment of Kamisoukoku in the first year of Emperor Ankan's reign (534), suggesting a date in the middle of the 6th century, and the lower Emperor Tenji dynasty (668-672) (for more details, see "Fusa Province").

In the "Kokugo Iken" (Ancient Words), it is written that Awa Imbe, who moved to Awa, became "Awa Imbe". In addition, there is a theory that it was the Zen-Ootomobe (also known simply as the Ootomobe) who held power in the Awa region. However, Izuhiko-no-mikoto, a tributary of Awa-Imabue, is said to have been active when Emperor Keiko moved to Awa-Ukijimangu in Kamisō Province, and his descendants include the Takayama clan of the Shaike of Shimodate Matsubara Shrine in Awa Province, the Musashi Province, the Sugiyama clan of the Sugiyama Shrine Shukube, and the Shukube of the Senkatsu Shrine in Honriku Province Kashima County, so it is a misunderstanding to say that the existence of the Imbe is unknown in the Awa region. In addition, this Zen-ohbunbu is mentioned in the "Takahashi Ujibumi" anecdote It was a tribal clan that was in charge of procuring food for the emperor under the supervision of the Zen clan (Kashiwadeuji, later Takahashi family), "Sachiyo Kyu-jihonki", and in wooden tablets excavated from Heijokyo. There is also a theory that the Awa Kunozo (Awa Kunozo) was also a member of the same clan, the Otomo Naoji (Ban Naoji), and that this clan likely served as the ritualists of the Awa Shrine and as the Awa County Governor  However, although the Zen-Otazabu in the eastern part of the country can be seen in the descendants of the Abe-gumi and the Kugokuzo of the Mononobe gumi, the Abe-kunozo was a tributary of the Musashi Kunozo and not a family member of the Zen-Otazabu. In addition, the genealogical chart shows that the central head of the Imbe family served as the governor of Awa County.

It is noteworthy that the "Kogo Shiki" itself was compiled for the purpose of correcting the disparity in legitimacy in the struggle for power with the Nakatomi clan. It is also one of the few people related to Awa. There are also a few people related to Awa who are mentioned in the Tenpyo 2 year (730) "Awa Province Gikura-chō" as being the eyes of the Awa provincial governor, Imbe Shukune Torimari (Imbe Torimaro?). If we assume the involvement of the Imbe gumi in the rituals of the Awa Shrine and Kobe, we can conclude that the Awa Imbe clan was connected to the Imbe clan. In addition, there are other theories that believe that the background of the story is the fact that people have been interacting with each other through the Kuroshio Current since ancient times.

Tradition 
There are many places in Chiba Prefecture that have been handed down from generation to generation regarding the relocation of Amatomino to the east. The main ones are as follows.

 Abo Shrine (Chiba Prefecture Tateyama, Chiba)
 Awa Shrine (Chiba Prefecture Tateyama City) Some say that the "zaza" is a reference to the Tentaitamamikoto Shrine (the general clan deity). In Shōwa7 (1931), a sea-eroded cave and a large number of human bones were discovered near the shrine grounds, and the Awa Shrine side temporarily entrusted them to the Imbe gumi and enshrined them as the Imbe Mound.
 The god of the goddess of mercy, meet with the goddess of mercy, Amateru.
 Shikinai Taisha. The god of the shrine is said to be the queen goddess of the god Awa. It is said that the god of the shrine is the queen goddess of Awa. The shrine was originally the same shrine. In the "Riju Sandaikage", the "Abusa no Tojibe", which enshrines the "Zenjin", is seen, suggesting a connection with such a female ritual group.
 Nurasaki Shrine (Tateyama City, Chiba Prefecture)
 Nurasaki Shrine (Tateyama City, Chiba Prefecture): named after the first seat of the god Awa.
 Shimodate Matsubara Shrine
 A Shikinai shrine. The shrine is located in Minamibōsō City. The deity of the shrine is Amanohiwashinomikoto (ancestor of Awa Imbe).
 Cape Tomisaki Shrine (Chiba Prefecture, Katsuura City)
 Said to be the place where Amatomi-no-mikoto died.

See also 

 The Tale of the Bamboo Cutter - Kaguyahime's godfather was "Mimuroto no Imbe no Akita" (Mimuroto Saibu no Akita).

References

Notes

External links 

 Imbe Culture Research Institute
 Society for the Study of Awa Historical Peoples

Japanese clans
Shinto
Imbe clan